List of Arecaceae or Palmae genera arranged alphabetically.

A 
 Acanthophoenix H.Wendl.
 Acoelorrhaphe H.Wendl.
 Acrocomia Mart.
 Actinokentia Dammer
 Actinorhytis H.Wendl. & Drude
 Adonidia Becc.
 Aiphanes Willd.
 Allagoptera Nees
 Alloschmidia H.E.Moore
 Alsmithia H.E.Moore
 Ammandra O.F.Cook
 Aphandra Barfod
 Archontophoenix H.Wendl. & Drude
 Areca L.
 Arenga Labill.
 Asterogyne H.Wendl.
 Astrocaryum G.Mey.
 Atitara
 Attalea Kunth

B 
 Bactris Jacq.
 Balaka Becc.
 Barcella (Trail) Trail ex Drude
 Basselinia Vieill.
 Beccariophoenix Jum. & H.Perrier
 Bentinckia Berry ex Roxb.
 Bismarckia Hildebrandt & H.Wendl.
 Borassodendron Becc.
 Borassus L.
 Brahea Mart. ex Endl.
 Brassiophoenix Burret
 Brongniartikentia Becc.
 Burretiokentia Pic.Serm.
 Butia (Becc.) Becc.

C 
 Calamus L.
 Calospatha Becc.
 Calyptrocalyx Blume
 Calyptrogyne H.Wendl.
 Calyptronoma Griseb.
 Campecarpus H.Wendl. ex Becc.
 Carpentaria Becc.
 Carpoxylon H.Wendl. & Drude
 Caryota L.
 Ceratolobus Blume
 Ceroxylon Bonpl. ex DC.
 Chamaedorea Willd.
 Chamaerops L.
 Chambeyronia Vieill.
 Chelyocarpus Dammer
 Chuniophoenix Burret
 Clinosperma Becc.
 Clinostigma H.Wendl.
 Coccothrinax Sarg.
 Cocos L.
 Colpothrinax Griseb. & H.Wendl.
 Copernicia Mart. ex Endl.
 Corypha L.
 Cryosophila Blume
 Cyphokentia Brongn.
 Cyphophoenix H.Wendl. ex Hook.f.
 Cyphosperma H.Wendl. ex Hook.f.
 Cyrtostachys Blume

D 
 Daemonorops Blume
 Deckenia H.Wendl. ex Seem.
 Desmoncus Mart.
 Dictyocaryum H.Wendl.
 Dictyosperma H.Wendl. & Drude
 Dransfieldia W.J.Baker & Zona
 Drymophloeus Zipp.
 Dypsis Noronha ex Mart.

E 
 Elaeis Jacq.
 Eleiodoxa (Becc.) Burret
 Eremospatha (G.Mann & H.Wendl.) H.Wendl.
 Eugeissona Griff.
 Euterpe Mart.

G 
 Gaussia H.Wendl.
 Geonoma Willd.
 Guihaia J.Dransf., S.K.Lee & F.N.Wei

H 
 Hedyscepe H.Wendl. & Drude
 Hemithrinax Hook
 Heterospathe Scheff.
 Howea Becc.
 Hydriastele H.Wendl. & Drude
 Hyophorbe Gaertn.
 Hyospathe Mart.
 Hyphaene Gaertn.

I 
 Iguanura Blume
 Iriartea Ruiz & Pav.
 Iriartella H.Wendl.
 Itaya H.E.Moore

J 
 Johannesteijsmannia H.E.Moore
 Juania Drude
 Jubaea Kunth
 Jubaeopsis Becc.

K 
 Kentiopsis Brongn.
 Kerriodoxa J.Dransf.
 Korthalsia Blume

L 
 Laccospadix Drude & H.Wendl.
 Laccosperma (G.Mann & H.Wendl.) Drude
 Latania Comm. ex Juss.
 †Latanites Massalongo, 1858
 Lavoixia H.E.Moore
 Lemurophoenix J.Dransf.
 Leopoldinia Mart.
 Lepidocaryum Mart.
 Lepidorrhachis (H.Wendl. & Drude) O.F.Cook
 Leucothrinax C.Lewis & Zona
 Licuala Thunb.
 Linospadix H.Wendl.
 Livistona R.Br.
 Lodoicea Comm. ex DC.
 Loxococcus H.Wendl. & Drude
 Lytocaryum Toledo

M 
 Manicaria Gaertn.
 Marojejya Humbert
 Masoala Jum.
 Mauritia L.f.
 Mauritiella Burret
 Maxburretia Furtado
 Medemia Wurttemb. ex H.Wendl.
 Metroxylon Rottb.
 Moratia H.E.Moore
 Myrialepis Becc.

N 
 Nannorrhops H.Wendl.
 Nenga H.Wendl. & Drude
 Neonicholsonia Dammer
 Neoveitchia Becc.
 Nephrosperma Balf.f.
 Normanbya F.Muell. ex Becc.
 Nypa Steck

O 
 Oenocarpus Mart.
 Oncocalamus (G.Mann & H.Wendl.) Hook.f.
 Oncosperma Blume
 Orania Zipp.
 Oraniopsis J.Dransf., A.K.Irvine & N.W.Uhl

P 
 Parajubaea Burret
 Pelagodoxa Becc.
 Phoenicophorium H.Wendl.
 Phoenix L.
 Pholidocarpus Blume
 Pholidostachys H.Wendl. ex Hook.f.
 Physokentia Becc.
 Phytelephas Ruiz & Pav.
 Pigafetta (Blume) Becc.
 Pinanga Blume
 Plectocomia Mart. ex Blume
 Plectocomiopsis Becc.
 Podococcus G.Mann & H.Wendl.
 Pogonotium J.Dransf.
 Polyandrococos Barb.Rodr.
 Ponapea Becc.
 Prestoea Hook.f.
 Pritchardia Seem. & H.Wendl.
 Pritchardiopsis Becc.
 Pseudophoenix H.Wendl. ex Sarg.
 Ptychococcus Becc.
 Ptychosperma Labill.

R 
 Raphia P.Beauv.
 Ravenea C.D.Bouche
 Reinhardtia Liebm.
 Retispatha J.Dransf.
 Rhapidophyllum H.Wendl. & Drude
 Rhapis L.f. ex Aiton
 Rhopaloblaste Scheff.
 Rhopalostylis H.Wendl. & Drude
 Roscheria H.Wendl. ex Balf.f.
 Roystonea O.F.Cook

S 
 Sabal Adans.
 Sabinaria R.Bernal & Galeano
 Salacca Reinw.
 Satakentia H.E.Moore
 Satranala J.Dransf. & Beentje
 Schippia Burret
 Sclerosperma G.Mann & H.Wendl.
 Serenoa Hook.f.
 Socratea H.Karst.
 Solfia Rech.
 Sommieria Becc.
 Syagrus Mart.
 Synechanthus H.Wendl.

T 
 Tahina J.Dransf. & Rakotoarinivo
 Tectiphiala H.E.Moore
 Thrinax Sw.
 Trachycarpus H.Wendl.
 Trithrinax Mart.

V 
 Veillonia H.E.Moore
 Veitchia H.Wendl.
 Verschaffeltia H.Wendl.
 Voanioala J.Dransf.

W 
 Wallichia Roxb.
 Washingtonia H.Wendl.
 Welfia H.Wendl.
 Wendlandiella Dammer
 Wettinia Poepp.
 Wodyetia Irvine

Z 
 Zombia L.H.Bailey

References 

 
Arecaceae